Korean Russian or Russian Korean may refer to:

South Korea-Russia relations
Russia-North Korea relations
Cyrillization of Korean
Russians in Korea
Ethnic Koreans in the former USSR
Koryo-saram, 19th-century immigrants to the Russian Far East who were later deported to Central Asia
Sakhalin Koreans, Japanese colonial-era immigrants stranded on Sakhalin when the Soviets invaded
North Koreans in Russia, citizens of North Korea who migrated to Russia after the division of Korea
Koryo-mar, the language of the Koryo-saram
Eurasian (mixed ancestry) people of Korean and Russian descent
North Korea–Russia border